In decision theory, the weighted sum model (WSM), also called weighted linear combination (WLC) or simple additive weighting (SAW), is the best known and simplest multi-criteria decision analysis (MCDA) / multi-criteria decision making method for evaluating a number of alternatives in terms of a number of decision criteria.

Description
In general, suppose that a given MCDA problem is defined on m alternatives and n decision criteria. Furthermore, let us assume that all the criteria are benefit criteria, that is, the higher the values are, the better it is. Next suppose that wj denotes the relative weight of importance of the criterion Cj and aij is the performance value of alternative Ai when it is evaluated in terms of criterion Cj. Then, the total (i.e., when all the criteria are considered simultaneously) importance of alternative Ai, denoted as AiWSM-score, is defined as follows:

For the maximization case, the best alternative is the one that yields the maximum total performance value.

It is very important to state here that it is applicable only when all the data are expressed in exactly the same unit. If this is not the case, then the final result is equivalent to "adding apples and oranges."

Example
For a simple numerical example suppose that a decision problem of this type is defined on three alternative choices A1, A2, A3 each described in terms of four criteria C1, C2, C3 and C4. Furthermore, let the numerical data for this problem be as in the following decision matrix:

For instance, the relative weight of the first criterion is equal to 0.20, the relative weight for the second criterion is 0.15 and so on. Similarly, the value of the first alternative (i.e., A1) in terms of the first criterion is equal to 25, the value of the same alternative in terms of the second criterion is equal to 20 and so on.

When the previous formula is applied on these numerical data the WSM scores for the three alternatives are:

 

Similarly, one gets:

 

Thus, the best choice (in the maximization case) is either alternative A2 or A3 (because they both have the maximum WSM score which is equal to 22.00). These numerical results imply the following ranking of these three alternatives: A2 = A3 > A1 (where the symbol ">" stands for "greater than").

See also 
 Decision-making software
 Weighted product model

References 

Control theory
Decision theory
Mathematical and quantitative methods (economics)
Multiple-criteria decision analysis
Risk
Statistical inference